Joëlle Ceccaldi-Raynaud (born 9 February 1951) is a French politician. As a member of parliament, she represents one of the districts of the Hauts-de-Seine department  (close to Paris). As a politician, she is affiliated to the Union for a Popular Movement party. She is Puteaux city mayor as well.

Ceccaldi-Raynaud's constituency in the department of Hauts-de-Seine had been held by future President Nicolas Sarkozy, and includes the town of Neuilly-sur-Seine, of which he was mayor for many years. When Sarkozy resigned the seat in 2002 to join the Government of Jean-Pierre Raffarin, newly appointed as Prime Minister by President Chirac, Ceccaldi-Raynaud filled the post. Her father, Charles, had held the seat when Sarkozy resigned it a first time in 1993 to join the Édouard Balladur Cabinet.

Ceccaldi-Raynaud retired from the National Assembly of France at the 2012 elections ; the assembly's constituencies have been redrawn for that election.

References

1951 births
Living people
French people of Italian descent
People from Algiers
Knights of the Ordre national du Mérite
Women mayors of places in France
The Republicans (France) politicians
Women members of the National Assembly (France)
Deputies of the 12th National Assembly of the French Fifth Republic
Deputies of the 13th National Assembly of the French Fifth Republic
Politicians from Île-de-France
21st-century French women